David John Russell is a former Royal Navy officer. Russell was born in Leeds in 1952 and attended Leeds Central High School. He joined the Royal Navy in 1970 and commanded three submarines and one surface warship during a career in which he reached the rank of commodore. He was the first commanding officer of HMS Vanguard, the United Kingdom's first Trident missile submarine.

Following the September 11 attacks in 2001, he directed the UK submarine response in the campaign against terrorism when UK submarines engaged terrorist targets in Afghanistan with Tomahawk cruise missiles. For a time he was responsible for developing the strategic goals and produced operational deployment, corporate resource and output plans for the UK fleet. He led the UK effort to rescue survivors from the sunken Russian submarine Kursk in the Barents Sea in 2000.

Graduate of the Royal College of Defence Studies in 1995 and the Joint Service Staff College in 1998, he completed the Financial Seminar for Senior Managers at London Business School in May 2002 and joined the Bedford Charity (Harpur Trust) as Chief Executive in June 2002. In 2004 he gained a first class honours degree in law with the Open University.

He lives in Bedford with his wife, Kathy.

References

Living people
Graduates of the Royal College of Defence Studies
Royal Navy personnel of the War in Afghanistan (2001–2021)
Royal Navy submarine commanders
1952 births
Alumni of London Business School
Alumni of the Open University
British chief executives
Military personnel from Leeds